Neu-Anspach is a town in the Hochtaunuskreis in Hesse, Germany.

Geography

Neighbouring communities
Neu-Anspach borders in the north on the town of Usingen, in the east on the community of Wehrheim, in the south on the town of Bad Homburg and in the west on the community of Schmitten.

Economy and infrastructure

Transport
The nearest Autobahn interchange on the A 661 is about 13 km from the community's centre. The interchange on the A 5 is about 15 km away, Bad Homburg about 12 km and Frankfurt International Airport about 35 km.

As for local public transport there are direct connections to Frankfurt am Main and Bad Homburg with the RMV (Rhein-Main-Verkehrsverbund or Rhine-Main Transport Network) line 15, known as the Taunusbahn. Moreover, there are buslines to Usingen and Königstein im Taunus.

Near Neu-Anspach lies the Anspach Airport.

Educational institutions
In Neu-Anspach there is an integrated comprehensive school with a gymnasial upper level, the Adolf-Reichwein-Schule, as well as the primary school at the Hasenberg and the one on the Wiesenau.

Adolf-Reichwein-Schule takes part in a cultural exchange with Monroe High School located in Monroe, Wisconsin. This exchange takes place every other year with the German students going to Monroe in the fall  of even numbered years, and the U.S. students going to Germany the following summer.

Culture and sightseeing
The best known attractions are:
 the Hessenpark Open-Air Museum (Freilichtmuseum Hessenpark)
 the nearby Lochmühle Leisure Park (Freizeitpark Lochmühle)
 the Saalburg Roman Fort

Mayors
 Fritz Jäger (1911–1918)
 Emil Becker (1918–1933)
 Rudolf Henrici (1933–1946)
 Heinrich Schneider (1946–1960)
 Rudolf Selzer (1960–1984)
 Heinz Born (1984–1991)
 Rudi Rübsamen (temporary) (1991–1993)
 Gerd Hillen (1993–2005)
 Klaus Hoffmann (2005–2017)
 Thomas Pauli (since 2017)

References

External links
 www.neu-anspach.de Neu-Anspach
 Adolf-Reichwein-Schule homepage
 Thalgau (partner community

Hochtaunuskreis